The Medici String Quartet is  British string quartet.

The Medici Quartet has been ensemble in residence at the University of Surrey since 1996, as well as having a strong link to the Royal College of Music in Stockholm. It was formed in 1971 and somewhat disbanded in 2007 when Paul Robertson became seriously ill. Robertson died of a heart condition on 26 July 2016.

Members 
Paul Robertson, first violin, who plays a Domenico Montagnana violin made in Venice in 1729. 
Stephen Morris, second violin, who plays a Joannes Udalricus Eberle violin made in Prague in 1760. 
Ivo-Jan van der Werff, viola, who plays a Giovanni Grancino viola made in Milan circa 1690. 
Anthony Lewis, cello, who plays a Giacinto Rugeri cello made in Cremona circa 1690.

References 

 Robertson, Paul, Soundscapes: A Musician's Journey Through Life, 2016, London, Faber & Faber.

English string quartets